JPC is an x86 emulator written in pure Java. It can run on any platform that supports the Java virtual machine. It creates a virtual PC compatible machine that can run MS-DOS and other x86 operating systems. Programs inside JPC can run up to 20% of the native processor speed. JPC was written by the Oxford University Subdepartment of Particle Physics.

Features 
 Safe, secure and portable due to being 100% pure Java
 Snapshot facility
 Remote disk option
 Integrated debugger
 Network card (tested by playing network Doom)
 PC speaker emulation
 Virtual FAT32 drive to wrap a directory

Compatibility 
 boots DOS
 boots graphical Linux (DSL, Feather)
 boots many Linux's into text mode
 boots Windows 3.0

Emulated hardware 
 Southbridge chipset: PIIX3
 Chipset: Intel i440FX PCI Host Bridge
 Network device: NE2000
 Storage: P-ATA
 Real-time clock: MC146818
 Direct Memory Access Controller (DMA): Intel 8237
 Interval Timer (IT): Intel 8254
 Serial Port: 16450 UART
 Floating-point unit (FPU)

See also 

 Dioscuri is a third-party JPC-based x86 emulator written in Java.
 Comparison of platform virtualization software

References

External links
 
 

X86 emulators
Free software programmed in Java (programming language)
Free emulation software